WVRL (88.3 FM) is a radio station  broadcasting a Contemporary Christian format. Licensed to Elizabeth City, North Carolina, United States, the station serves the Roanoke Rapids area. The station signed on in February 2003. The station is currently owned by Liberty University, Inc., and is part of Liberty's network of CCM stations branded as "The Journey" that rebroadcast WRVL in Lynchburg, VA.

History
The station began broadcasting in 2003, and held the call sign WGPS. It was owned by CSN International and aired a Christian format. In 2008, CSN International sold WGPS, along with a number of other stations, to Calvary Radio Network, Inc. These stations were sold to Calvary Chapel Costa Mesa later that year. In 2010, Calvary Chapel Costa Mesa sold WGPS and several other stations to Liberty University for $1.25 million, and the station's call sign was changed to WVRL.

Translators
In addition to the main station, WVRL is relayed by an additional translator to widen its broadcast area.

Previous logo

References

External links

VRL
Radio stations established in 2003
2003 establishments in North Carolina
Liberty University